Erico Spinadel (6 May 1929 – 25 February 2020) was an Austrian and Argentine industrial engineer who specialized in Wind Power. Spinadel was born in Vienna, and obtained his PhD at the University of Buenos Aires, Argentina, in 2004.

Erico Spinadel joined the Argentine National Atomic Energy Commission (CNEA) in 1956 and in January 1959 he was the first operator to drive a nuclear reactor (the RA 1) to critical conditions. In this way, started the use of nuclear energy in the southern hemisphere, generating electricity and also producing radioisotopes for hospitals and for industrial applications.

Between 1994 and 2001, he was Consulting Full professor at the University of Buenos Aires, School of Engineering. From 1986 to 1994 he was Director of the Electricity Department of the School of Engineering, University of Buenos Aires FIUBA. From 1994 he was Consulting Emeritus Professor at the National University of Lujan.  
In 1994, he was President of the Argentine Wind Energy Association (AAEE). From 2008 he was Regional Director on the Latin American Wind Energy Association (LAWEA). and member of the board of the World Wind Energy Association
He was Wind Energy consultant for the United Nations Industrial Development Organization UNIDO-ONUDI since 1992, at the special invitation of the respective Governments several missions in Indonesia and the Far East.

Dr. Erico Spinadel was a leader in the field of Wind Power in the research of a multidisciplinary systemic approach for developing countries got wide international recognition. 
He was the author of more than 7 books and published more than 50 research papers. He died in Pinamar, Argentina.

He married Vera Martha Winitzky, a mathematician. The couple had 4 children: Laura, Pablo, Irene and Andrea.

Books 
Electrical and Magnetic Circuits and Special Topics, Nueva Librería, Buenos Aires, Argentina. , 1982
Transformers, Nueva Librería, Buenos Aires, Argentina. , 1984
Electrical and Magnetic Circuits and Special Topics, 2nd expanded and revised edition, Nueva Librería, Buenos Aires, Argentina. , 2004	
Transformers, 2nd expanded and revised edition, Nueva Librería, Buenos Aires, Argentina.  , 2004	
Wind Energy Systemic Multidisciplinary Approach, Nueva Librería, Buenos Aires, Argentina.   , 2009
Wind Energy Systemic Multidisciplinary Approach 2, Nueva Librería, Buenos Aires, Argentina.  , 2015

Papers 
Wind energy; Suggested possibilities for the Republic Argentina. Journal of engineering military year 5 No. 9. Author: E. Spinadel. PG.: 86–91. Registration of intellectual property 302506. SSN: 0326-5560, 1989
Wind energy: farms or isolated points? Military engineering year 6 No. 10. Authors: E. Spinadel and C. Moon Pont. PG.: 66–70. Registration of intellectual property 302506. SSN: 0326-5560, 1990
Wind Diesel Project in El Cuy, Argentine Patagonia – European Community Conference on Wind Energy Proceedings – ECWEC '90. Authors: E. Spinadel and C. Luna Pont. Pg. 49–54. , 1990
Why do I say "Yes" now? Wind farms in Patagonia. Proceedings European Community Wind Energy Conference, ECWEC'93. Authors: E. Spinadel, C. Luna Pont, G. Dutt. Pg. 118–131. . Professor E. Spinadel was a member of the Scientific Committee, 1993
Argentina Technology for Developing Countries commissioned by International Organism. Military Engineering magazine, Year 12, N°27. Author: E. Spinadel. Pg.: 34–36. Copyright Registry 124635. SSN: 0326-5560, 1995
Aeolic-Electric Energy generated in the Patagonia transmitted to consumption centers following the hydrogen energy vector. Military Engineering magazine, Year 12, N°28. Author: E. Spinadel. Pg.: 30–36. Copyright Registry 124635. SSN: 0326-5560, 1996
Aeolic-Electric Energy generated in the Patagonia transmitted to consumption centers following the hydrogen energy vector. Environment and Society magazine, N°3, 1996, CONAPAS. Authors: E. Spinadel, F. Gamallo y S. L. Gracia Nuñez. Pg.: 8–13. Copyright Registry 666267, 1996
About the proper use of aids. Windpower Magazine, vol.12 n°11, Denmark. Author: E. Spinadel. Pg.: 4. ISSN 0109-7318, 1996
The Transmission of Electric Energy Generated in Wind Farms in the Argentine Patagonia to the Consumption Centers using the Hydrogen Vector. Proceedings of EUWEC'96, Göteborg, Sweden, May. Authors: E. Spinadel, S. L. Gracia Nuñez, F. Gamallo. Pg. 472–475. . Author E. Spinadel was member of the Scientific Committee, 1996
Wind Power Generators designed for Weak and Moderate Wind Conditions. Proceedings of European Union Wind Energy Conference, EUWEC'96. May. Authors: E. Spinadel, F. Gamallo, P. Spinadel. Pg.: 329–332. , 1996
Wind Energy Export through Liquid Hydrogen. Military Engineering magazine, Year 14, N°32. January–April. Authors: E. Spinadel, F. Gamallo y S.L. Gracia Nuñez. Pg.: 14–16. Copyright Registry 669150. SSN: 0326-5560, 1997
 Wind Energy Export through Liquid Hydrogen. Environment and Society magazine, Year 2, N°8. May. Authors: E. Spinadel y F. Gamallo. Pg.: 6–9. Copyright Registry 666267, 1997
Mathematical Model for Determining the Accumulated Hydrogen Reserve in Wind-Generated Electricity At Distant Sites. Proceedings of M&D'98, Second International Conference on Mathematics & Design 98, San Sebastián, Spain, 1–4 June. Pg. 333–340. . Authors: V. Spinadel, F. Gamallo, E. Spinadel, 1998
An Autonomous Wind-Hydrogen System for Electricity Services to Isolated Locations. Proceedings of XII World Hydrogen Energy Conference, Buenos Aires, 21–26 June de 1998. Volume 1, Pg. 777–782. . Authors: F. Menzl, E. Spinadel, 1998
Mathematical Model for determining the Accumulated Hydrogen Reserve in Wind-Generated Electricity at Distant Sites. Proceedings of XII World Hydrogen Energy Conference, Buenos Aires, 21–26 June. Volume 2. Pg.1719–1728. . Authors: V. Spinadel, F. Gamallo, E. Spinadel, 1998
Patagonian Wind Exported as Liquid Hydrogen. Proceedings of XII World Hydrogen Energy Conference, Buenos Aires, 21–26 June 1998. Volume 1. Pg. 369–376. . Authors: E. Spinadel, F. Gamallo, S. Luis Gracia Nuñez, P. Spinadel, M. Cerviño, 1998
Make better use of Wind Energy Primary Source in Argentina. Part 1. Electrotechnical Argentina magazine, Volume LXXXIV, January–February. Pg 30–34. ISSN 0370-7857. Author: E. Spinadel, 1998
Make better use of Wind Energy Primary Source in Argentina. Part 2. Electrotechnical Argentina magazine, Volume LXXXIV, March–April. Pg 71–78.. ISSN 0370-7857. Author: E. Spinadel, 1998
Home electric Energy from hydrogen and fuel cells. Authors: E.Spinadel, S.L.Gracia Nuñez, J.Maislin, R.Wurster, F.Gamallo. MW magazine, No.228, April, Pg.s. 72–76. Copyright Registry 173449. ISSN 0025-8180, 2000
Defining Characteristics of a wind-electric Power Generator for Electrolyzes Alkaline. Authors: E.Alvarez, R.Class, J.Dalmaso, F.Gamallo, J.Maislin, E.Spinadel. Military Engineering Magazine, ISSN 0326-5560, Year 18, No.43, January–June., Pg: 36–37, 2001
Home electric Energy from hydrogen and fuel cells. Authors: E.Spinadel, J.Maislin, F.Gamallo. MW Magazine , Year 24, No.242, June, Pg: 102–106, 2001
Socio-economic determiners for a greater efficient utilization of a primary Energy source in Argentina. Authors: E.Spinadel, F.Gamallo. Megavatios Magazine ISSN 0325-352X, year 24, No.242, June, Pg.: 120–142, 2001
Wind Power: a long-term investment. Author: E. Spinadel. Tecnoil Magazine RPI 324–856, year 23, Nº 232, October, Pg.: 54–60, 2001
Mathematical Model for Optimizing Sizes of "PEM" Fuel Cells in Combined Natural Gas and Electricity Energy Supply. Authors: F. Gamallo; J. Maislin; E. Spinadel; Vera W. de Spinadel. M&D2001, The Third International Conference, Deakin University, Geelong, Australia. , Pg. 166 – 173, 2001
Advantages of decentralized electricity and heat supply for buildings, using fuel cells. Author: Erico Spinadel. Presented in Symmetry: Art & Science, Brussels, Belgium. . Pg: 403–413, 2002
 Wind Energy in Argentina, Legislation, Economical & Technical Aspects. The World Wind Energy Association. The 1st World Wind Energy Conference, Berlin, Germany, 2–6 July 2002. Authors: E. Spinadel, J. Gil, F. Gamallo. . Ext: 5 Pg. Published on CD, 2002
An isolated wind-hydrogen system for the Martín García Island. 10º International Symposium REGWA, Nutzung Regenerativer Energiequellen und Wasserstofftechnik, University of Applied Sciences of Stralsund, Stralsund, Germany, November 2003. Author: E. Spinadel. Pg. 138 – 143, 2003

Awards 
 Gold medal 30º university teaching FI UBA
 First prize in the BIEL light + building BIEL'95'Award 
Emeritus Professor National University of Luján, 2011
 Big Prize of the Civic Parliament of the Humanity to the Community Greatness granted to the Argentine Association of Wind Energy, 2010

References

External links 

Official website 
 Energía Estratégica 
 De viejo, uno recuerda más historias de las que quisiera by Daniel dos Santos 
Wind Farms in Latin America: Comparing Legislations of Principal Countries 
bild der wissenschaft 
Wind Power for the World 
Creating the Infrastructure for Capacity Building in the use of Wind Energy 

1929 births
2020 deaths
University of Buenos Aires alumni
Academic staff of the University of Buenos Aires
Engineers from Vienna
Argentine engineers
Austrian emigrants to Argentina